This is a summary of 1988 in music in the United Kingdom, including the official charts from that year.

Summary
The growing popularity of house music was evident in the charts by the start of 1988, with many songs of this genre becoming big hits, such as "House Arrest" by Krush, "Beat Dis" by Bomb the Bass and "Rok da House" by The Beatmasters. Acid house band S'Express had two Top 10 hits this year including a number 1 in April with the song "Theme from S'Express", but the biggest dance hit of the year came from London singer Yazz, who had first had a big hit with producers Coldcut on the song "Doctorin' The House". Still with Coldcut, but now with her name billed as the lead artist, her song "The Only Way Is Up" topped the chart for five weeks, becoming the second biggest-selling single of the year, and paved the way for a successful solo career, including the follow-up "Stand Up For Your Love Rights" which hit No.2 in October.

One of the biggest successes of the year was 19-year-old Kylie Minogue, well known to the public from her role in the Australian soap opera Neighbours which had been airing on the BBC since 1986. The popularity of "girl next door" Minogue and her on-screen character Charlene Mitchell ensured chart success. Signed to the production trio Stock Aitken Waterman, her debut international song "I Should Be So Lucky" was number 1 for five weeks, and all of her other solo releases this year – "Got to Be Certain", "The Loco-Motion" and "Je Ne Sais Pas Pourquoi" – reached number 2. Her album Kylie was also number 1 for six weeks, the biggest-selling album of the year and the fifth best-selling album of the entire decade. All Kylie's hits were produced by Stock Aitken Waterman who continued to score hit after hit this year. The production powerhouse also scored Top 10s with Mel and Kim ("That's The Way It Is", No.10, February) Sinitta ("Cross My Broken Heart", No.6, March), Rick Astley ("Together Forever", No.2, March and "Take Me to Your Heart", No.8, November), Bananarama ("I Want You Back", No.5, April), Hazell Dean ("Who's Leaving Who", No.4, April), Brother Beyond ("The Harder I Try", No.2, August and "He Ain't No Competition", No.6, November). In September, another star from Neighbours – Minogue's co-star Jason Donovan – debuted with his Stock Aitken Waterman-produced hit "Nothing Can Divide Us" which reached number 5 and he would go on to outsell even Kylie the following year.

Popular teenage acts other than Minogue to emerge this year included the American singer Tiffany who scored three Top 10 hits including the No.1 "I Think We're Alone Now" while fellow American teenage star Debbie Gibson also crossed over to the British Charts and had four Top 20 hits. Gibson's biggest hit was the 1980s-compilation staple "Shake Your Love" which reached number 7 in January. Meanwhile, from Italy came Sabrina whose infamous appearances in skimpy swimsuits became tabloid-fodder throughout the year as her pan-European smash hit "Boys (Summertime Love)" hit number 3 in June and the Stock Aitken Waterman-produced follow-up "All of Me" peaked at number 25 three months later.

New British boyband Bros took five singles into the Top 5 this year including "When Will I Be Famous?" and their only number 1 "I Owe You Nothing", a re-issue of their first single originally released in 1987. Wet Wet Wet scored the first number 1 of their long run of hits with a cover of "With A Little Help From My Friends" which held the top position for 3 weeks.

Also making her chart debut this year was nineteen-year-old Tanita Tikaram, who launched her career with the critically acclaimed album Ancient Heart, containing the Top 10 hit "Good Tradition" and the intriguing "Twist In My Sobriety" which peaked at number 22 in October. Eddi Reader also rose to prominence during 1988 as the lead-singer of Fairground Attraction. The band made number 1 with the song "Perfect" and followed it up with another Top 10 hit, "Find My Love" and number 2 album The First of a Million Kisses.

Making chart comebacks after long-absences were Cher, re-launching her music career with "I Found Someone", a number 5 hit written and produced by Michael Bolton. Belinda Carlisle revived her career this year with three Top 10s including the number 1 "Heaven is a Place on Earth" while Kim Wilde scored a career-best three successive Top 10s with "You Came" (No.3), "Never Trust a Stranger (No.7) and "Four Letter Word" (No.6). Pop duo Dollar scored their ninth and final Top 20 hit with comeback hit "Oh L'amour", a cover of an early Erasure single, which made number 7 in April, and also making a chart comeback was the song "A Groovy Kind Of Love", originally a hit in 1965 for The Mindbenders, it hit number 1 in September for Phil Collins, taken from the film Buster in which Collins also starred.

Some of the more unusual hits of the year included a remix of the theme tune from the popular television series Doctor Who, by "The Timelords", who would go on to have huge success in the early 1990s under the name The KLF. Their song "Doctorin' The TARDIS" (a play on Coldcut's "Doctorin' The House") was number 1 for a week in June. A television advertisement for Miller Lite beer used the 1969 song "He Ain't Heavy, He's My Brother" by The Hollies, which became a number 1 in September 19 years after its original release, and an advert for Coca-Cola gave Robin Beck a number 1 with the ballad "First Time". Film and Television actress Patsy Kensit, a teenager in 1988, also reached the Top 10 this year in the band Eighth Wonder. Their Pet Shop Boys–produced UK debut "I'm Not Scared" slowly climbed up the Top 40 and peaked at number 7 in May. The band were more popular in Italy and Japan where they scored several number 1 hits.

The race for Christmas number one was a battle between Cliff Richard, with a career stretching back to the 1950s and his seasonal song "Mistletoe and Wine", and new star Kylie Minogue with "Especially for You", a duet with her Neighbours co-star Jason Donovan released to coincide with their characters' on-screen wedding.  Cliff won the battle with the biggest-selling song of the year, but "Especially for You" climbed to number 1 in the new year of 1989, eventually selling just short of 1 million copies.

1988 sees Radio 1 start to broadcast on FM on a full time basis across much of the UK when five major transmitters begin radiating Radio 1 on FM for the first time. Previously, Radio 1 had only been available on FM for approximately 25 hours per week, when it 'borrowed' BBC Radio 2's FM frequency at certain points of the day.

New classical works by British composers included oboe and trumpet concertos from Peter Maxwell Davies and Michael Finnissy's Red Earth for orchestra.  Devotional works included Nicholas Jackson's Variations on ‘Praise to the Lord, the Almighty’ and John Tavener's The Akathist of Thanksgiving.  Russian pianist Evgeny Kissin made his Proms debut during the 1988 season, whilst Sir Andrew Davis gave up his role as conductor of the Toronto Symphony Orchestra to become director of Glyndebourne.

Events
10 March – Andy Gibb dies 5 days after his 30th birthday at John Radcliffe Hospital in Oxford of myocarditis, an inflammation of the heart muscle caused by a recent viral infection and exacerbated by his years of cocaine abuse.
30 April – The Eurovision Song Contest, held in the RDS Simmonscourt Pavilion, Dublin, is won by Celine Dion, representing Switzerland.  The UK entry, "Go", sung by Scott Fitzgerald, finishes in second place after leading for most of the judging.

Charts

Number-one singles

Number-one albums

Year end charts

Best-selling singles of 1988

Best-selling albums of 1988

Notes:

Classical music
Malcolm Arnold – Robert Kett Overture (Op. 141) 
Geoffrey Burgon – The Trial of Prometheus
Peter Maxwell Davies
Oboe Concerto
Trumpet Concerto No. 1 (from the Strathclyde Concertos)
Stephen Dodgson – Promenade I for two guitars
Michael Finnissy – Red Earth for orchestra
Oliver Knussen - Flourish with Fireworks (original version)
Michael Nyman – String Quartet No. 2
Philip Sparke – A Swiss Festival Overture
John Tavener – The Akathist of Thanksgiving

Opera
Mark-Anthony Turnage – Greek

Film and Incidental music
Michael Nyman - Drowning by Numbers directed by Peter Greenaway.

Musical films
It Couldn't Happen Here, starring the Pet Shop Boys
Testimony: The Story of Shostakovich, starring Ben Kingsley, featuring the London Philharmonic Orchestra and the voices of John Shirley-Quirk and Felicity Palmer

Musical theatre
22 October - Sherlock Holmes - The Musical by Leslie Bricusse opens at the Northcott Theatre, Exeter.

Births
24 January – Jade Ewen, singer and actress
13 February – Aston Merrygold, singer-songwriter, dancer, and actor 
27 March – Jessie J, singer
5 May – Adele, singer-songwriter
13 July – Tulisa Contostavlos, singer-songwriter and member of N-Dubz
19 July – Charlene Soraia, singer-songwriter
25 June – Amanda Marchant and Sam Marchant, singers (Samanda)
4 August – Tom Parker, singer, (The Wanted)
6 September – Max George, singer, (The Wanted)
26 September 
James Blake, singer-songwriter and producer
Mark Simpson, clarinet player and composer
7 October – Lauren Mayberry, Scottish singer-songwriter (Chvrches)
2 December – Fuse ODG, Ghanaian-English recording artist
15 December – Lady Leshurr, rapper, singer-songwriter and producer
21 December 
Yasmin, singer-songwriter and DJ
Alexa Goddard, singer
31 December – Holly Holyoake, singer

Deaths
2 February – Solomon, pianist, 85
10 March 
Andy Gibb, singer, 30 (myocarditis)
William Wordsworth, composer, 79
25 May – Martin Slavin, composer and music director, 66
19 August – Sir Frederick Ashton, dancer and choreographer, 83 
24 August – Kenneth Leighton, composer, 57 (cancer)
11 September – H. Hugh Bancroft, organist and composer, 84
23 September – Arwel Hughes, composer and conductor, 79
15 October – Kaikhosru Shapurji Sorabji, composer, music critic, pianist and writer
11 November – William Ifor Jones, conductor and organist, 88
7 December – John Addison, composer, 78
21 December – Paul Jeffreys, bass player (Be-Bop Deluxe and Steve Harley & Cockney Rebel), 36 (air crash)
25 December – Denis Matthews, pianist and musicologist, 69

Music awards

BRIT Awards
The 1988 BRIT Awards winners were:

Best British producer: Stock Aitken Waterman
Best classical recording: Ralph Vaughan Williams – Symphony No. 5
Best international solo artist: Michael Jackson
Best Music Video: New Order – "True Faith"
Best soundtrack: "The Phantom of the Opera"
British album: Sting – "...Nothing Like the Sun"
British breakthrough act: Wet Wet Wet
British female solo artist: Alison Moyet
British group: Pet Shop Boys
British male solo artist: George Michael
British single: Rick Astley – "Never Gonna Give You Up"
International breakthrough act: Terence Trent D'Arby
International group: U2
Outstanding contribution: The Who

See also
 1988 in British radio
 1988 in British television
 1988 in the United Kingdom
 List of British films of 1988

References

External links
BBC Radio 1's Chart Show
The Official Charts Company

 
British music
British music by year